The BET YoungStars Award honors young African-American people who have made an impact in the world of television, film, music, or sports. It has been presented at the annual BET Awards since 2010.

Marsai Martin has won the award four times. The youngest winner is Willow Smith (10) and the youngest nominee is Lonnie Chavis (7).

Winners and nominees
Winners are listed first and highlighted in bold. Age listed is at the date of the awards show.

2010s

2020s

Multiple wins and nominations

Multiple wins

2 wins
 Yara Shahidi
 Keke Palmer
4 wins
 Marsai Martin

Multiple nominations

 2 nominations
 Diggy Simmons
 Gabrielle Douglas
 Zendaya
 Ricky Guillart
 3 nominations
 Caleb McLaughlin
 Storm Reid
 Yara Shahidi
 Quvenzhané Wallis

 4 nominations
 Miles Brown
 Willow Smith
 Jacob Latimore
 5 nominations
 Marsai Martin
 Keke Palmer
 Jaden Smith

References

BET Awards
Awards honoring children or youth